Petzold (or Petzoldt) is a German surname. Notable people with the surnames include:

Barbara Petzold (born 1955), East German cross-country skier
Charles Petzold (born 1953), American programmer and technical author
Christian Petzold (composer) (1677–1733), German composer and organist
Christian Petzold (director) (born 1960), German film director
Eduard Petzold (1815–1891), German landscape gardener
Guillaume-Lebrecht Petzold (1794-?), French piano maker
Harald Petzold (born 1962), German politician
Klaus Petzold, German handballer
Konrad Petzold (1930–1999), German film director, writer and actor
Joachim Petzold (1913–1991), major in the Luftwaffe
Johann Christoph Petzold (1708–1762), German sculptor 
Johann Christoph Pezel (also Petzold) (1639-1694), German violinist, trumpeter, and composer
Linda Petzold (born 1954), computer scientist and mechanical engineer
Maik Petzold (born 1978), Germany triathlon athlete
Martin Petzold (born 1955), German tenor
Martin Petzoldt (1946–2015), German theologian and Bach scholar
Paul Petzoldt (1908–1999), American mountaineer

See also
August Georg Wilhelm Pezold

German-language surnames